Italia's Next Top Model, Season 3 is the third season of the Italian reality television show based on the American program of the same name. It is broadcast on SkyUno, a channel of the Italian subscription television Sky TV. It started airing in October 2009.

The host is once again the Russian top model and actress Natasha Stefanenko. The other permanent judges are Micheal Giannini, art director and talent scout of model agency d’Management,  former top model, Gianni Versace's and Giorgio Armani's muse Nadege du Bospertus and fashion journalist Giusi Ferré. In each weekly episode a celebrity guest judge will also join the judging panel.

The winner of the competition was 24-year-old Anastasia Silveri from Chieti. She received a one-year-contract with d’Management Group as well as a Max Factor campaign worth €150,000.

Changes
The cast was increased to 16 girls in the first episode, but it was later revealed that according to the show rules only 14 girls would make it into the house leaving two girls eliminated in the first episode and not mentioned in the show opening theme. A live audience was introduced during the weekly judging sessions and the elimination ceremony, with the five judges openly expressing their vote against the girl in the bottom two they want to eliminate. Moreover, the girls paired up in the bottom two must face each other before elimination in a runway challenge in front of the audience, to help the judges decide who is more deserving to stay in the competition. This changes left the viewers sceptical and generally disappointed. Due to the introduction of these changes, the weekly reward challenges were not shown in the weekly episodes anymore but placed in the daily videos aired during day-time. Also this was the first season that featured related contestants with twin sisters Gilda and Veronica Testa.

Episode summaries

Episode 1
First aired October 2, 2009

After months of auditions of more than 1,500 wannabe models, the 16 girls chosen for the competition meet in Via Montenapoleone, the most important fashion street in Milan. They are briefly introduced by short clips and soon after the group is complete they are told to join Natasha, the host, and Michael Giannini, art director of d'Management, in the place where their first elimination challenge will take place.

Michael tells the girls they have only fifteen minutes to pick an outfit and do their make-up to get ready for an improvised runway show in the city center, with an audience made by passers-by. During the show Elisa draws the attention of the public by wearing a transparent top part without underwear, and Jade manages to be noticed by her striking Barbie-type of look.

Then the episode moves to the studio, where in this season the models' evaluation will be made before a live audience. The 16 models are presented and Michela Maggioni, winner of Season 2, makes her entrance and a video shows the beginning of her career as a model after her win, with photoshoots for important fashion magazines such as Marie Claire or Harper's Bazaar, and her appearances on runway shows in Milan and Singapore.

Then the contestants' performances on the runway are evaluated in the studio, focusing on the worst of the group. Michela brings the girls out of the studio and in front of the models' house that this year will also be their "Model School". Meanwhile, the judges deliberate, praising Elisa for daring it all and Anastasia for her performance, while others like Athina, Eleonora, Giada, and Veronica V. are criticized.

From the studio, Natasha proceeds to tell Michela the names of the girls who will make it into the house, giving her the task of delivering the photos before the front door of the Model School. Athina, Giada, and Veronica V. are placed in the bottom three for their unimpressive walk and bad outfit choice. Giada is called, but only to be told to be eliminated, while Athina is invited to pick her photo since she is chosen to enter the models' house, leaving Veronica V. eliminated as well.

Bottom three: Athina Covassi, Giada Combusti & Veronica Valentini
Eliminated: Giada Combusti & Veronica Valentini
Guest judges: Martina Colombari, Italian model and actress

Episode 2
First aired October 9, 2009

The 14 aspiring models are brought to the Charme&Cheveux salon to receive their makeovers and most of the girls are excited and happy but not Caroline who complains about the outcome, also being upset for hurting her back just before being taken to the salon. Athina cries in silence for her hair is being cut short.

The following day the girls are told by Natasha mail to get ready since they are brought to Milan military academy, where they are welcomed by soldiers and get dressed in military uniforms. A coach subsequently spurs them to complete a military training where they get dirty in mud. Once all the girls are done with the task it is time for their first photoshoot where they pose as sexy soldiers in a jeep. Most of the girls manage to deliver a good picture.

In the judging studio with audience Anastasia, Caroline, Jade and Sabrina are praised for their work while Athina, Carlotta, Diletta, Elisa, and Veronica are considered to be the worst of the week.

In the end the judges place Athina and Carlotta in the bottom two for their stiff poses and the two girls face each other in a runway challenge to show which one deserves to stay in the competition. With an open verdict, getting three votes out of five from the judging panel, Athina is chosen by Natasha, Michael and Giusi to leave the competition for still being less convincing on runway.

Bottom two: Athina Covassi & Carlotta Castagneris
Eliminated: Athina Covassi
Guest judge: Giampiero Mughini, former journalist
Special guest: Ciccio Graziani, football coach
Featured photographer: Nancy Fina

Episode 3
First aired October 16, 2009

The 13 remaining girls are awakened at 5 a.m. by the siren sound announcing a Natasha Mail. The mail says the girls will take part in this week runway challenge that will decide which one of them will be going home.

The girls are driven to the fashion town of Milan, an area under construction where they are welcomed by Natasha and fashion designer John Richmond they will be supervised by during the runway challenge. After getting prepared, the girls show their improvements in their walks, with some of them failing to impress.

The episode continues in the judging studio, where the judges, and especially Nadege, praise Anastasia for being consistent on the catwalk, Karis for showing a new confidence and aggressive walk, Sabrina and Carlotta for their overall good performances. Anisia is told to give something more and Elisa is reprimanded for an unrefined walk and pose and for looking down on the catwalk. Veronica is told to come across as boring on the runway, Diletta is scolded for being out of theme, having performed a high-fashion walk instead of an aggressive one, Eleonora is chastised for being too slow and generally bland, making herself forgettable, even though her look was liked by John Richmond. But the unexpected comes at Jade's evaluation moment, where the Italian-Australian girl reveals she figured out modelling is not exactly what she wants to do in the future, and feeling homesick she decides to leave the competition, much to Michael's astonishment, but the models' coach is glad to know Jade made up her mind.

After deliberation Eleonora and Veronica are eventually paired up in bottom two for their unimpressive and unmemorable performances and, after a runway challenge the panel states the votes. Getting three votes out of five, from Natasha, Giusi and the guest judge, Veronica is sent packing and sadly separated from her twin sister Gilda.

Quit: Jade Albany Pietrantonio
Bottom two: Eleonora Meneghini & Veronica Testa
Eliminated: Veronica Testa
Guest judge: Clarence Seedorf, football player and fashion amateur
Special guest: John Richmond, fashion designer

Episode 4
First aired October 23, 2009

This week Giorgia has a reunion with the rest of the group since she feels isolated by many of the girls who accuse her of being two-faced and some girls openly tell her she comes across as too bossy about housework.

Natasha mail announces the girls they will be taken to the Milanese countryside for a lingerie photoshoot. The eleven aspiring models are driven to a farm where they discover they will pose in glamour underwear with pigs and cows in the farm stables. Caroline is disgusted by the pigs while Sabrina and Anastasia feels at ease in this set. Anisia has to be coached a bit into her pose and Eleonora struggles during the shoot.

In the studio the girls are evaluated with mixed reviews. All the judges agree Anastasia delivered a perfect shot and Anisia is told to be more present and show confidence in person. Caroline is praised while Giorgia is reprimanded for her body pose and facial expression. Sabrina is liked by Natasha but criticized by Nadege. Nadege also states Carlotta's face is too hard to master on photo and Eleonora is criticized by the judges for her stiff arms and lost facial expression. Elisa is praised for her energy, though her pose comes across as too extreme, and Diletta for using her curvy body.

After a deliberation where Anisia, Carlotta, Eleonora and Giorgia are said to have the worst shots, Carlotta and Eleonora are left in the bottom two and, following a runway challenge, judges Giusi, Michael, and Nadege vote against Eleonora for still not delivering a confident walk, thus evicting her from the competition.

After Eleonora's elimination a new contestant replacing Jade's spot is introduced to the girls: Marianna.

Bottom two: Carlotta Castagneris & Eleonora Meneghini
Eliminated: Eleonora Meneghini
Guest judge: Alena Seredova, glamour model
Featured photographer: Settimio Benedusi

Episode 5
First aired October 30, 2009

During the week Caroline and Diletta attempted a short escape from the models' house. By breaking the rules they are punished by Michael and cannot take part in the weekly reward challenge where all the other contestants can hug their loved ones come to Milan to meet them.

This week challenge sees the girls facing a photo shoot where the 11 contestants must pose as actresses styled in 1950s look to create a horror movie poster where the aspiring models must show how they can express fear on set. Caroline is not interested in screaming when the photographer asks her to do so and has to be coached by Michael, Giorgia comes across as a bit stiff while Sabrina manages to make the photographer and the art director laugh because of her exaggerate performance.

In the studio the girls' evaluations result to be quite different from judge to judge. Sabrina is liked by Giusi for her funny look while the rest of the panel criticize her for being overdone, Elisa is said to be too static and not creative, Carlotta is still reprimanded by Nadege for her facial limits. Anastasia is told she could have done better while Gilda and Karis gets mixed reviews. Diletta and Anisia are praised for their facial expressions, but is Marianna who vows the judges with her shot. Caroline is scolded for her attitude on set. Giorgia is liked by Natasha but comes across as unnatural to Michael.

Caroline gets placed in the bottom two for her unprofessional behavior and is joined by Carlotta whose limited expressions range makes her this week eliminated through the votes of Nadege, guest judge Edwige and Giusi.

Bottom two: Carlotta Castagneris & Caroline Cecere
Eliminated: Carlotta Castagneris
Guest judge: Edwige Fenech, actress and film producer
Featured photographer: Nicola Majocchi

Episode 6
First aired November 6, 2009

This week's reward challenge saw the remaining girls acting in a scene with a professional actor, playing the part of a suspicious girlfriend. Anisia and Karis were convincing, but it was Karis who played the role in the best way thus earning a free shopping afternoon in Milan in the company of the Italian actor she played with.

For their weekly challenge the girls were driven to a car dump, there Michael explained they would be walking on a haulaway wearing eco-chic flowy dresses designed by Leila Hafzi, the models would also be displaying floral ornaments on their heads. The task proves to be intimidating for some girls and particularly for Elisa who comments on her tension before her performance. Marianna has a meltdown after the challenge, feeling she might have lost control of her body and fearing to be ousted for this mistake she will not be able to forgive herself for.

In the studio the panel praises Gilda for her improvements, Anastasia for her consistency and Giorgia for her perfect runway walk. Nadege warns Karis her walk is overdone and not impressive, while Anisia is scolded for not watching the camera in front of her at the end of the runway. Elisa disappoints the judges, in fact Natasha and Giusi point out she is not progressing and Michael claims she is not learning. Diletta is reprimanded for her heavy walk, and so is Marianna for not having overall control of her movements.

Following a deliberation where Anisia, Diletta, Elisa and Marianna are deemed the worst of the week the judges decide to place Diletta and Elisa in the bottom two. After a runway challenge where the two girls walk in bikinis and metallic dresses Natasha, Michael and Nadege decide to end Elisa's journey in the competition.

Bottom two: Diletta Neri & Elisa Provaso
Eliminated: Elisa Provaso
Guest judge: Irene Pivetti, former politician and TV presenter
Special guest: Luca Calvani, actor

Episode 7
First aired November 13, 2009

During the week Anisia plays a practical joke to Giorgia by drawing moustaches on her wallpaper as best girl of the week. The joke is not well received since the two girls never got along well so it leads to an argument where Giorgia accuses Anisia of being immature and jealous since her joke comes across as a naughty action to her, Anastasia comes in Giorgia's defence by telling Anisia she is just rude and not capable to model.

For this week's photo shoot the nine remaining girls must pose as sensual and ironic pin-up models promoting typical foods of Italian cuisine such as tomatoes, pasta, mozzarella, cheeses, peppers and chillies. Sabrina surprises everyone on set by playing with the food and the chef the models pose with, while Karis feels unable to portray sensuality with her body and bursts in tears of discouragement. Diletta impresses the photographer with playful poses. Caroline refuses to dare with her body to avoid resulting vulgar on her shot stating she did enough on set. Most of the girls enjoy the funny photoshoot.

In the studio Sabrina gets praises by the panel for her presence in the shot, so does Diletta for her result. Anastasia and Marianna are liked by the judges, while Anisia and Gilda get mixed reviews. Giorgia is said to be too technical in her poses she became flat and boring in her picture, while Karis is reprimanded for losing confidence and executing poses poorly, Caroline is scolded for her attitude and lack of professionalism and variety although appreciated for her beauty.

Giorgia and Karis eventually land in the bottom two and following a runway challenge Giorgia's self-confidence convinces Michael, Nadege and the guest judge to vote for Karis as this week's eliminated girl.

Bottom two: Giorgia Albarello & Karis Decò
Eliminated: Karis Decò
Guest judge: Luca Tommasini, choreographer and art director
Featured photographer: Nancy Fina
Special guest: Simone Rugiati, chef

Episode 8
First aired November 20, 2009

The eight remaining contestants have been spending the week practising their runway walks with two male models who lived with them in the models' house. In fact in this week's runway challenge the girls will walk in an elegant runway show paired up with male models.

The girls are driven to Palazzo Clerici, an historical building of Milan. There they will walk with Ermanno Scervino dresses in the mirrors' room, painted by Tiepolo's frescoes. Within such a refined context, Michael asks them to show an elegant and sophisticated walk, as well as a passionate interaction in the final pose at the end of the runway with the male model they are paired up with.

In the studio the panel gives the aspiring models contrasting feedbacks, Nadege is particularly dissatisfied with most of the girls' outcomes. Anastasia is told by Michael to be less self-centered while other judges find her extremely refined and involved in the interaction with her male partner. Anisia is noticed for improving her walk and showing more confidence, although Nadege still finds flaws in her. Diletta is reprimanded for her heavy walk and unelegant gestures, while Giorgia disappoints the panel for being lifeless and not passionate in her performance. Sabrina is not liked by Nadege who defines her classless in what she does. Natasha scolds Marianna for resulting too actressy when interacting with her male partner, thus losing a model's attitude. Giusi praises Caroline for her elegance and talent, while Nadege recognizes she felt uncomfortable with the dress by her stiff final pose. Gilda is told to have walked elegantly and appreciated for her interaction and final glance towards the camera.

Following a debated deliberation where Nadege accuses Michael of defending the girls too much, the panel decides that Diletta and Giorgia deserve to be placed in the bottom 2. After a runway challenge Diletta is chosen by Giusi, Michael and Nadege to leave the competition for lacking a model's presence while Giorgia is spared for her convincing performance.

Bottom two: Diletta Neri & Giorgia Albarello
Eliminated: Diletta Neri
Guest judge: Pietro Taricone, actor
Featured male models: Emanuele & Mitia

Episode 9
First aired November 27, 2009

The seven remaining contestants are administered their second makeovers at Charme&Cheveux salon in Milan. Anastasia gets a radical change, her hair being partially shaved and dyed red, while other girls receive minor changes. All the girls seem glad of their new looks.

For this week's photoshoot the girls are driven to a spa, there they will be posing underwater with Morellato jewels. Anastasia finds troubles in executing the task while Sabrina overcomes her fear of water and succeeds in the shooting.

In the studio the girls are evaluated on their outcomes. Anisia is universally praised for her improvement and her beautiful shot, while Caroline disappoints all the panel with a terrible photo. Anastasia is said to have produced her worst performance to date, however the panel praises her for her competitive spirit and self-confidence. Sabrina receives positive feedbacks although Nadege still wants her to show more elegance. Gilda is criticized for her unelegant arm and her cold facial expression.

During deliberation Anastasia, Caroline and Gilda are said to have the worst photos, but in the end it is Caroline and Gilda who face each other in the bottom two. After walking in a runway challenge the panel saves Caroline for showing more confidence and potential, as Giusi, Michael and the guest judge vote to out Gilda from the competition for not being able to improve further.

Bottom two: Caroline Cecere & Gilda Testa
Eliminated: Gilda Testa
Guest judge: Gianluca Vialli, former football player
Featured photographer: Nicola Majocchi

Episode 10
First aired December 4, 2009

With six girls remaining, the house is divided into two groups: Anastasia, Giorgia and Sabrina on one side, Anisia, Caroline and Marianna on the other. Anastasia and Anisia show an ever increasing rivalry while days are passing-by.

For the week's photoshoot the aspiring models are being photographed with Addy van den Krommenacher elegant gowns and will pose together with a live tiger named Lucy. Sabrina and Caroline are commanded for not showing fear on set, being quite pleased by the presence of the animal, while Anisia is afraid of it.

In the studio the girls are evaluated by the panel, with Anastasia being praised for her elegant body position. Sabrina manages to redeem herself in Nadege's eyes by producing a sophisticated pose and facial expression, thus earning appreciation from the judges. Marianna and Giorgia on the other hand are not positively judged for being too technical in their poses, Giusi points out Giorgia's face comes out vulgar in her shot and the panel agrees Marianna's facial expression is not well defined. Michael criticizes both girls for posing in a forced way. Caroline is noticed for her beauty that is once again her best asset, but Nadege is still unsatisfied by her lack of effort in posing, stating that the girl relies on it and does not give something more which is required in a fashion photo. Anisia disappoints Natasha and Michael for her heavy shoulders position and not having presence in her shot, even if her facial expression works.

During deliberation Anisia, Caroline, Giorgia and Marianna are being critiqued for their flaws. Natasha tells the girls that two of them will be eliminated. Anisia, Giorgia and Marianna land in bottom three. Unfortunately Giorgia is chosen to leave the competition for producing the worst shot. After bursting out in tears she is comforted by the host and leaves the studio. Following a runway challenge Anisia, despite having a less impressive walk, is picked to remain in the running for being more convincing in her photos, while Marianna's journey is put to an end by the votes of Giusi, Michael and Nadege.

After Marianna's elimination the four remaining girls are told by Natasha they will sail on a cruise on the Mediterranean to visit Marseille and Barcelona.

Bottom three: Anisia Tripa, Giorgia Albarello & Marianna Di Martino
First eliminated: Giorgia Albarello
Second eliminated: Marianna Di Martino
Guest judge: Vladimir Luxuria, show-woman
Featured photographer: Settimio Benedusi

Episode 11
First aired December 11, 2009

The girls leave Milan and reach Genova, there they sail on a cruise on the Mediterranean sea. The four remaining contestants visit Marseille and Barcelona, but the ship is the place where they face their weekly photoshoot. Anastasia, Anisia, Caroline and Sabrina must pose as 1980s-styled Bond girls in the ship's casino together with the models' coach, Michael Giannini. All the girls perform well on set and are praised by the photographer for delivering excellent shots.

In the studio the panel commends the girls for their efforts. Anisia redeems herself with her picture and manages to deliver a striking glance and an impressive pose. Anastasia wows Michael with her interaction on set and is praised for her natural elegance she always brings on her performances, although Giusi expected more intense eyes. Sabrina is told to have produced a very good shot thanks to her glance and her presence, Nadege commands her for improving and becoming more refined, still she points out she should have been more elegant in her pose. Caroline is noticed for her natural beauty and for her sensuality, she is praised for posing with a new facial expression but the judges wonder if that fits the theme properly.

After reviewing all the pictures the judges decide to leave Caroline and Sabrina in bottom 2. They walk in a runway challenge and soon after Nadege, Michael and guest judge designer Elio Fiorucci vote to eliminate Caroline from the competition thus leaving Anastasia, Anisia and Sabrina as the three finalists of this season.

Bottom two: Caroline Cecere & Sabrina Cereseto
Eliminated: Caroline Cecere
Guest judge: Elio Fiorucci, fashion designer
Featured photographer: Settimio Benedusi

Episode 12
First aired December 18, 2009

The three finalists Anastasia, Anisia and Sabrina face their ultimate photoshoot, an editorial for "A" Magazine. The girls are really focused to deliver their best performance and impress the panel. On set, the girls wear elegant long dresses they have to use to create dynamic movements in a minimalistic atmosphere.

In the studio the girls are praised for making it thus far and completing their journey by improving challenge after challenge. Anastasia is commended for her pose and her dreamy and softer face, Anisia is praised for showing her new stronger self and Sabrina for an overall elegant and sophisticated outcome that made her overcome her explicit sensuality.

In the end the judges decide that Anastasia is the first girl who can pass to the ultimate challenge, the final runway show. Anisia and Sabrina are left as bottom two and Anisia is chosen as the second finalist. Sabrina is eliminated, she leaves the studio after thanking all the judges for the teachings they gave her, thus moving the panel that had to take a difficult decision.

Bottom two: Anisia Tripa & Sabrina Cereseto
Eliminated: Sabrina Cereseto

In the final runway show in the studio, Anastasia and Anisia walk in Dsquared outfits in front of the panel and the designers of the brand, Dean and Dan Caten. Each girl wears three outfits they have to show with a strong and impressive catwalk.

After the runway show the judges make their final decision. In the end Anastasia is proclaimed the winner thanks to her consistent performances, her fashion body, her drive and shear determination, as well as for her skilled walk making her the most complete model of the season.

Final two: Anastasia Silveri & Anisia Tripa
Runner-up: Anisia Tripa
Italia's Next Top Model: Anastasia Silveri
Guest judges: Dean and Dan Caten, fashion designers
Featured photographer: Nicola Majocchi

Contestants
(ages stated are at start of contest)

Summaries

Call-out order

 The contestant was eliminated
 The contestant quit the competition
 The contestant won the competition

 In episode 1, the pool of 16 girls was reduced to 14 who moved on to the main competition.
 In episode 3, Jade quit the competition. She was replaced by Marianna the following episode after Eleonora's elimination took place.
 The call-outs do not reflect the girls' actual performances in the first five episodes.

Challenges guide
Episode 1: Improvised runway show in Milan
Episode 2: Sexy soldiers in a military-themed photoshoot
Episode 3: Runway challenge for John Richmond
Episode 4: Photoshoot with sexy lingerie in a farm stable
Episode 5: Photoshoot inspired to a 50s horror movie poster
Episode 6: Runway challenge in a car dump with Leila Hafzi eco-chic dresses
Episode 7: Photoshoot as pin-ups with Italian foods
Episode 8: Runway challenge with Ermanno Scervino dresses
Episode 9: Underwater photoshoot with Morellato Jewels
Episode 10: Photoshoot with a tiger wearing Addy van den Krommenacher dresses
Episode 11: Casino Royale inspired photoshoot
Episode 12: Editorial photoshoot for "A" magazine 
Episode 12: Final runway show for Dsquared2

References

 Italia's Next Top Model Official Site
 Natasha Stefaneko about INTM3

External links 
 Sexy Cocktail Dress
 

3